A constitutional referendum was held in Mauritania on 12 July 1991. The new constitution would restore multi-party democracy for the first time since the 1960s, as well as creating a bicameral Parliament with a Senate and National Assembly. The constitution would not include term limits for the President. It was approved by 97.94% of voters with an 85.3% turnout.

Results

References

Mauritania
1991 in Mauritania
Referendums in Mauritania
Constitutional referendums
July 1991 events in Africa